Kangerluarsuup Qaqqarsua is a mountain located in the Upernavik Archipelago of northwest Greenland, a region known for its stunning natural scenery and rugged terrain. The mountain is part of the Qaqqarsuaq mountain range and is one of the highest peaks in Greenland, rising to an elevation of 1,988 meters (6,522 feet) above sea level.

The name "Kangerluarsuup Qaqqarsua" means "large fjord-like valley" in the Greenlandic language, which is a reference to the deep valleys that cut through the mountain range. The mountain is also sometimes known by its Danish name, Grønlands højeste bjerg, which means "Greenland's highest mountain."

Despite its impressive height and location in a remote and rugged part of Greenland, Kangerluarsuup Qaqqarsua is not a particularly well-known mountain outside of mountaineering circles. However, it has been climbed by several expeditions over the years, including a Danish expedition in 1932 and a British expedition in 1970.

Today, Kangerluarsuup Qaqqarsua is mainly a destination for experienced mountaineers and outdoor enthusiasts who are looking for a challenging and remote adventure in one of the most beautiful and unspoiled wilderness areas in the world.

Mountains of the Upernavik Archipelago